The 2021 Ms. Olympia competition was a IFBB professional bodybuilding competition and part of Joe Weider's Olympia Fitness & Performance Weekend 2021 that was held on October 8, 2021, at the Orange County Convention Center in Orlando, Florida. It was the 37th Ms. Olympia competition held. Other events at the exhibition include the 212 Olympia, Bikini Olympia, Classic Physique Olympia, Figure Olympia, Fitness Olympia, Men's Physique Olympia, Mr. Olympia, Wellness Olympia, Wheelchair Olympia, and Women's Physique Olympia competitions.

Prize money
 1st - $50,000
 2nd - $20,000
 3rd - $10,000
 4th - $5,000
 5th - $4,000
 Total: $89,000

Results
1st - Andrea Shaw
2nd - Helle Trevino
3rd - Margie Martin
4th - Mona Poursaleh
5th - Irene Andersen
6th - Michaela Aycock
7th - Virginia Sanchez
8th - Janeen Lankowski
9th - Margita Zamolova
10th - Nadia Capotosto
11th - MayLa Ash
12th - Sheena Ohlig
13th - LaDawn McDay
14th - Silvia Matta
15th - Reshanna Boswell
16th - Leah Dennie

Comparison to previous Olympia results:
Same - Andrea Shaw
+1 - Helle Trevino
-1 - Margie Martin
Same - Irene Andersen
+7 - Janeen Lankowski
+1 - Margita Zamolova
-7 - MayLa Ash
-1 - LaDawn McDay
-6 - Reshanna Boswell

Scorecard

Attended
5th Ms. Olympia attended - Helle Trevino
3rd Ms. Olympia attended - Margie Martin
2nd Ms. Olympia attended - Irene Andersen, MayLa Ash, Reshanna Boswell, Janeen Lankowski, LaDawn McDay, Andrea Shaw, and Margita Zamolova  
1st Ms. Olympia attended - Michaela Aycock, Nadia Capotosto, Leah Dennie, Silvia Matta, Sheena Ohlig, Mona Poursaleh, and Virginia Sanchez
Previous year Olympia attendees who did not attend - Kim Buck, Nicki Chartrand, Asha Hadley, Theresa Ivancik, Monique Jones, and Yaxeni Oriquen-Garcia

Notable events
 The song played during the posedown was Kalki by E.S. Posthumus.
 It was speculated Iris Kyle would attend 2021 Ms. Olympia after having withdrawn from the 2020 Ms. However, she did not attend.

2021 Ms. Olympia Qualified

Points standings

 In the event of a tie, the competitor with the best top five contest placings will be awarded the qualification. If both competitors have the same contest placings, than both will qualify for the Olympia.

See also
 2021 Mr. Olympia

References

External links
Ms. Olympia homepage

2021 in bodybuilding
Ms. Olympia
Ms. Olympia
History of female bodybuilding